Walking on Air is a British musical film featuring jazz, songs, dance, tap dance, and variety comedy routines including several performances by African American performers. Starring performers include Johnny Worthy, Bertie Jarrett, Sonny Thomas, Ray Ellington, The Skating Avalons, singer Jill Allen singing "Honeysuckle Rose", Maudie Edwards, Myrette Moreven, Miki Hood, Jasmine Dee, Loderick Caton, Coleridge Goode, and Freddie Crump on drums. The Huntley Film Archives have extended clips from the film. Aveling Ginever directed. Ginever, Johnny Worth and Val Guest wrote the screenplay.

An obituary for Peter Noble describes the film as having been virtually unseen. It debuted Susan Shaw, then known as Patsy Sloots.

The film was made at Marylebone Studios in London.

The film was described as having plenty of dancing but a thin storyline about an aspiring ballerina who is working in a variety show at a night club.

History
In 1942 Jarrett was on BBC radio with Maurice Winnick's orchestra. In 1944 Jarrett and Worthly appeared in a variety show.

Songs
Songs in the film include:
"Carolina"
"St Louis Blues"
"Walking on Air" by Johnny Worthy
"Honeysuckle Rose"
"I Just Don't Know How to Swing" by Peter Noble (songwriter)
 "Harlem jamboree" by Johnny Worthy
 "Basin Street blues" by Spencer Williams

Cast
Mr Austin played by Ray Ellington

References

1946 films
British musical films
British black-and-white films
1946 musical films
1940s British films